Barry Veneman (born 22 March 1977) is a Dutch former motorcycle racer.  He was born in Zwolle, Netherlands.

Career statistics

By season

Races by year
(key) (Races in bold indicate pole position) (Races in italics indicate fastest lap)

Supersport World Championship

Races by year
(key) (Races in bold indicate pole position) (Races in italics indicate fastest lap)

Superbike World Championship

Races by year
(key) (Races in bold indicate pole position) (Races in italics indicate fastest lap)

References

External links

Living people
Dutch motorcycle racers
500cc World Championship riders
1972 births
21st-century Dutch people